Khrystynivka is a city in Uman Raion of Cherkasy Oblast (province) of Ukraine. It hosts the administration of Khrystynivka urban hromada, one of the hromadas of Ukraine. Population:

Administrative status 
Until 18 July, 2020, Khrystynivka served as an administrative center of Khrystynivka Raion. The raion was abolished in July 2020 as part of the administrative reform of Ukraine, which reduced the number of raions of Cherkasy Oblast to four. The area of Khrystynivka Raion was merged into Uman Raion.

History 
It is the site of an ancient mega-settlement dating to 4000–3600 BC belonging to the Cucuteni-Trypillian culture. The settlement was very large for its time, covering an area of 100 hectares. This proto-city is one of just 2,440 Cucuteni-Trypillia settlements discovered so far in Moldova and Ukraine. 194 (8%) of these settlements had an area of more than 10 hectares between 5000 - 2700 BC and more than 29 settlements had an area in the range 100 - 300 - 450 Hectares.

See also 

 List of cities in Ukraine

References

Cities in Cherkasy Oblast
Cities of district significance in Ukraine
Umansky Uyezd
Cucuteni–Trypillia culture